Andrei Denisovich Yakovlev (born 12 January 1995) is a Russian football player. He plays for FC Leningradets Leningrad Oblast.

Club career
He represented FC Zenit Saint Petersburg in the 2013–14 UEFA Youth League.

He made his debut in the Russian Professional Football League for FC Zenit-2 Saint Petersburg on 30 April 2015 in a game against FC Pskov-747.

He signed a 3-year-contract with FK Baumit Jablonec in June 2015.

He made his Russian Football National League debut for FC Khimki on 10 March 2018 in a game against FC Shinnik Yaroslavl.

References

External links
 
 

1995 births
Living people
Russian footballers
Association football defenders
Russian expatriate footballers
Expatriate footballers in the Czech Republic
FC Spartak Kostroma players
FC Zenit-2 Saint Petersburg players
FC Khimki players
FC Tambov players
FC Dynamo Saint Petersburg players
Czech National Football League players
FC Leningradets Leningrad Oblast players
FC Znamya Truda Orekhovo-Zuyevo players